4x4 is an Argentine-Spanish crime thriller film based on actual events by Mariano Cohn from a screenplay he co-wrote with Gastón Duprat. Produced by the latter, the film stars Peter Lanzani as Ciro, a criminal who breaks into a 4x4 SUV, owned by an obstetrician medic Enrique Ferrari (Dady Brieva), in order to steal the car stereo. The car has a security mechanism that cuts the power, trapping Ciro in the process.

Plot 
Ciro (Peter Lanzani) is walking in a neighborhood in Buenos Aires when he sees an SUV model car that catches his interest. He breaks into it, begins taking anything including the stereo, and defiles the car by peeing and passing gas. When he tries to get out, however, he cannot open the doors. He frantically tries to get out, ripping the door panels off but cuts his arm when reaching for the lock mechanism, the floor having reinforced steel, and when he tries his gun to shoot at the front windshield the bullet bounces off and the ricochet hits him in the thigh. He tries calling for help but his cellphone dies.

Ciro uses his shirt as a tourniquet to stop the bleeding, things get worse when he suffers from the heat being trapped forcing him to finish off the last of his Pepsi bottle. He sees a woman fixing her makeup using the car door window but when Ciro screams for help she does not hear him. Nighttime comes and Ciro is plagued by thirst, trying to lick the door windows for the water covering it.

Morning comes and Ciro reinstalls the stereo to play music, helping to keep his sanity. The stereo stops playing, a number calls the car with the caller ID saying ‘ME’. It is the owner of the car, Enrique, (Dady Brieva) a doctor specializing in obstetrics. He tells Ciro that the security system he built into the car, which he calls 4x4, has cut the electric power within the car at the moment Ciro broke in, the car is completely bulletproof, soundproofed and polarized; so no one will hear or see him crying for help, the only thing not secured is the gas tank but Enrique teases it's been rigged with an explosive so if Ciro disobeys he’ll blow Ciro up.

Enrique asks Ciro questions and talks about his personal life to him. He reveals that he is a widower, has a daughter and grandchild, and is suffering from terminal cancer with only a few months left to live. Ciro doesn't care about Enrique and demands to be set free, while threatening to kill Enrique and his family if he doesn't. Enrique hangs up and turns on the A/C to its strongest level, freezing Ciro to point of his lips turning blue from near hypothermia. Ciro also has to deal with his leg becoming infected from the gunshot wound and has no water or food.

Ciro continues to try and escape but the reinforced doors are too strong for him to penetrate with a tire iron. Ciro finds hope when a thief tries to break into the car, but his hopes are broken when the neighbors see what happens, assaults the thief, and calls the police to arrest him.

Enrique calls again to talk more about himself and turns off the A/C. Ciro becomes more frustrated as he wants water, but Enrique seems to enjoy messing with Ciro with his conversations. Eventually, he becomes weaker and delirious, he talks about how the world is run by the rich, and the poor trampled by them. Saying he won't obey their rules which is why he steals like his father and grandfather before him and won't obey the rules even if a gun was pointed at his head. Later his skin starts turning yellow, dehydrated, and starving takes its toll as well. Enrique calls and after Ciro answers a question with an answer he likes he tells him there is a washer hose hidden in the back with water to drink. Ciro finds it and fills his empty bottle, but instead of rationing the water, his dehydration causes him to gorge on it completely.

Days pass and Ciro’s sanity begins to drain. He tries to distract himself by drawing on the car interior, eating paper from the car’s manual, and urinating in a bottle to drink his urine to stay hydrated. After another call from Enrique asking for Ciro’s information, he tells Ciro that there is a chocolate bar hidden in the brake panel in the car for complying with his demands.

Enrique calls the next day, he says he has visited Ciro’s home seeing his wife Irina and his son Lionel. Enrique lied about Ciro’s whereabouts, claiming he works for the lottery and Ciro won $100,000 which Enrique gives to Irina to help move out of their apartment and buy a house. Ciro is in tears that Enrique had gone to his family asking what he did to Enrique to deserve his predicament. Enrique starts teasing Ciro that he has Ciro’s criminal record recounting his crimes from shooting brothers whose car shop Ciro robbed, beating a bus driver to death for stopping Ciro from robbing his passengers, finally that he stole a woman's car and purse alongside a friend and had accidentally run into an innocent bystander. Ciro denies responsibility for his actions claiming it was their fault for either pulling a knife on him or stopping him from stealing. Enrique says Ciro doesn't deserve his family for his crimes and hangs up.

Ciro makes a call to his wife and son after having charged his phone battery in the sunlight for days. He apologies for messing up again before the phone dies. At night after hitting the start button many times the car finally starts up, he drives in reverse and finally escapes. Suffering from his injuries he limps to a gas station where he takes bottles of water and a hamburger to eat. When the cashier alerts the security guard that Ciro hasn't paid for his food Ciro shoots him dead for disturbing him eating.

Ciro awakes realizing it was all a dream and soon he sees Enrique standing in front of him having made one last call. Enrique tries to take Ciro away to punish him more but Ciro manages to escape – only to be subdued once more in his weakened state. A police officer intervenes and the situation escalates to a public standoff with Enrique holding Ciro hostage. The police call in retired negotiator Julio Amadeo to talk to Enrique, but Enrique gets half the community on his side when he talks about how no one cares for people like him or the neighborhood when things go bad and Enrique is forced to handle things himself when the government won't step in.

With half the neighborhood siding for Enrique to kill Ciro and the other to let Ciro free, Julio finally convinces Enrique to surrender and release Ciro. Enrique gets into his car and detonates the explosive device, killing himself and possible bystanders in the crossfire. Ciro looks on sad-faced in the back of a police car finally having been freed from captivity but now has been arrested for his mistake. The media talks about Enrique and the event that transpired, having christened him the ‘Samurai Doctor’ for his strong convictions in seeing himself in the right, everyone talks about the changes that would have to make for the community to prevent further ordeal and get support from the government. Ciro is mentioned, he has received medical treatment and awaits trial for what took place.

Cast 
 Peter Lanzani as Ciro Bermúdez, a low class thug that breaks in into a 4x4 truck
 Dady Brieva as Dr. Enrique Ferrari, a high-class terminally ill obstetrician who was the victim of several criminal acts and owner of the vehicle Ciro breaks into
 Luis Brandoni as Julio Amadeo, a retired police mediator who intervenes amidst the situation
 Noelia Castaño		
 Gustavo Rodríguez

Production 

The development of the film began when Cohn was watching TV and found a news about a thief that got trapped in a car he tried to steal in Brazil, and later in Córdoba, Argentina to Roberto Desumvila. The producer and the director looked forward to spark debate about insecurity and its victims and criminals. Cohn and Lanzani deliberately aimed to avoid depicting Ciro as a stereotypical pibe chorro. As per usual in their filmography, Duprat and Cohn read the script with people they knew were alien to the film industry for output.

The film was shot in 22 days in a single set at Pol-ka's Estudios Baires. While both Brandoni and Lanzani agreed with the vision the director had, Brieva thought more of the film as the depiction of the alienation both seniors and the lower class citizens suffer in the system and society. The film features a self-reference in the background, in the form of a film poster for a hypothetical The Man Next Door 2: The Neighbour is Back. It was meant to be a simple joke, but when Cohn called Daniel Aráoz to tell him about it, Aráoz asked why not doing it for real and so the screenwriting for the sequel began. Peter Lanzani used Colin Farrell and Ryan Reynolds' performances in Phone Booth and Buried as acting reference. In the film, Ciro wears a pink Boca Juniors jersey. Cohn chose this particular jersey for several reasons: to create color contrast with the car's upholstery; because it is Boca's most controversial jersey; and to spark controversy. The film was dedicated to Alejandro Cohn, Mariano's brother who died in 2015.

Release 
The movie premiered on 4 April 2019 on 285 screens under distribution of Buena Vista International. The film did not get a theatrical release on Spain, and it was released on  instead.

Reception

Box office 
4x4 sold 10,605 tickets on its opening day in Argentina, ranking fourth. During its opening weekend 4x4 ranked 4th at the Argentine box office, selling 83,242 tickets, the best opening weekend for an Argentine film in the year. On its second weekend ranked 3rd, selling 56,909 tickets. On its third weekend ranked 5th, selling 50,932 tickets. On its fourth weekend ranked 4th, selling 21,535 tickets. On its fifth weekend ranked 6th, selling 12,290 tickets. On its sixth weekend ranked 10th, selling 5,327 tickets.

Critical response 
On Argentine review aggregator Todas Las Críticas, 46 of the 63 reviews of 4x4 are positive, with an average rating of 58/100.

Remakes 
The film inspired a Brazilian remake and, according to Duprat, there are plans for an American remake produced by David Lancaster.

The film was remade in Telugu language with the title Dongalunnaru Jaagratha (2022).

References

External links 

2010s Spanish-language films
2019 films
2019 crime thriller films
Argentine crime thriller films
Spanish crime thriller films
Films about trucks
Crime films based on actual events
Thriller films based on actual events
2010s Argentine films